Mateo Arias known professionally as Téo stylized as ¿Téo?, is a Colombian-American Latin contemporary pop Singer-songwriter, rapper and actor based in Los Angeles, California. He starred in the American Disney XD series Kickin' It as Jerry Martinez and the 2020 American Coming-of-age story Blast Beat as Carly Andres. Téo is known for his versatility, his mixed Spanish and English lyrics and his deep well crafted smooth vocals. In 2018, his debut studio album ¿Téo? was released and has amassed over 50 million streams on Spotify. Téo has worked with Jaden Smith, Lido, Willow Smith and fellow Colombian star, Kali Uchis.

Early life 
Mateo was born in Atlanta, United States to Colombian Spanish and English speaking parents Mónica and César Arias. He grew up in between Lawrenceville and Atlanta in a pseudo-Colombian culture in Georgia and was raised bilingual. Growing up, Mateo didn't speak English until he was about four years old.

Career 
Mateo started his career at an early age as an actor before launching his musical career in 2017 and released his debut single "Uno Dos" which featured his longtime friend Jaden Smith. The following year, he released 2 singles "Palm Trees" and "Orso (off top)". Since then he has released multiple singles including "Americano", "UNI2", "Hope 4" and "Buzzed" which featured American singer Willow Smith. His debut studio album "¿Téo?" was released in August 2018. In 2021, his second studio album "Sol" was released.

References

External links 

 ¿Téo? at AllMusic

Living people
American male actors
American singer-songwriters
American rappers
American people of Colombian descent
Colombian actors
Colombian musicians
Year of birth missing (living people)